Malyavin (Russian: Малявин) is a Russian masculine surname, its feminine counterpart is Malyavina. It may refer to
Anastasiya Malyavina (born 1997), Ukrainian swimmer
Filipp Malyavin (1869–1940), Russian painter and draftsman
Valentina Malyavina (born 1941), Soviet and Russian actress 
Vladimir Malyavin (born 1973), Russian long jumper

Russian-language surnames